Arthur Robie Best (March 18, 1953 – October 14, 2014) was an American football running back  who played three seasons in the National Football League (NFL) with the Chicago Bears and New York Giants. He was drafted by the Los Angeles Rams in the sixth round of the 1977 NFL Draft. He first enrolled at the University of Notre Dame before transferring to Kent State University. Best attended Bishop Hartley High School in Columbus, Ohio. Best died on October 14, 2014 in Pickerington, Ohio. He had cancer and liver problems for at least five years before his death.

References

External links
Just Sports Stats
College stats

1953 births
2014 deaths
Players of American football from Louisiana
American football running backs
Notre Dame Fighting Irish football players
Kent State Golden Flashes football players
Chicago Bears players
New York Giants players
Players of American football from Camden, New Jersey